Buchivacoa Municipality is a municipality in Falcón State, Venezuela.

Municipalities of Falcón